The protest against conscription of yeshiva students was a mass rally held in Jerusalem on March 2, 2014. Its organizers called for a "million-man protest" against a proposed law overturning the exemption from military service for Haredi talmudical students and criminalizing those who refused to enlist in the Israel Defense Forces. From 300,000 to 600,000 people gathered in one of the largest protests in Israeli history.

History

The protest opposed Israeli military and civil conscription of Orthodox yeshiva students, who have been exempted from military conscription or national service since 1977. A petition led to a 1998 high-court ruling that the Minister of Defense Act was not intended to exempt the Orthodox community on such a large scale, and it was decided that the issue required new legislation from the Knesset.

A public committee, headed by Justice Zvi Tal, was appointed after the 1999 Supreme Court decision. Its findings led to the 2002 deferment for yeshiva students (known as the Tal Ruling), regulating the deferral of yeshiva students with the rationale that their religious studies constitute national service. The ruling, which provided a timeline of five years, was extended an additional five years in 2007. During the summer of 2012, the court ruled that the law was unjust and must expire. With its expiration IDF service is mandatory for all members of the Haredi community, with a penalty (imprisonment for up to five years) for those who refuse to enlist. However, the law is not enforced against members of the Haredi community by authority of the Defense Minister.

After several unsuccessful attempts to draft a new law (such as the Plesner Committee), the Special Committee for the Equal Sharing of the Burden Bill (also known as the Shaked Committee after its chairwoman, Bayit Yehudi MK Ayelet Shaked) was formed. During its deliberations (ongoing at the time of the protest) the committee proposed a law establishing annual quotas for the drafting of yeshiva students for military or national service and calling for criminal sanctions against draft evaders if the quotas are not met by mid-2017. The bill would mandate a gradual increase in recruitment levels of yeshiva students. Each year 1,800 promising students would be granted exemptions to continue their studies, and yeshiva students beyond draft age would be allowed to enter the workforce.

Smaller protests against the conscription of Yeshvia students began around 2012 with the meeting of the Plesner committee. The first of such protests was held in Kikar HaShabbat in Jerusalem with thousands in attendance.

Preparation 

On February 24, 2014, the leaders of Agudath Israel, Degel HaTorah and Shas including Rav Aharon Leib Shteinman, Rav Shmuel Auerbach, the Vizhnitzer Rebbe, and Rav Shalom Cohen gathered for a conference in Bnei Brak and decided on a demonstration a week after the conference. All haredi boys and men over age nine were summoned to attend. Rav  Shteinman publicly encouraged attendance at the protest. He said that in the IDF there is Gilui Arayos (sexual immorality) Shfichus Damim (bloodshed), and Avodah Zarah (idolatry), but greater than these 3 cardinal sins is the Chilul Hashem that a country calling itself the Jewish State should put quotas on Torah learning.

Leading rabbis from the conservative wing of the national religious community (including Shmuel Eliyahu, Mordechai Sternberg, Micha Halevi and Shlomo Aviner) supported the rally, and a group of nationalist haredi rabbis issued a proclamation calling on the public to participate in the religious, Zionist rally. Other groups, such as the Tzohar and Beit Hillel rabbinical associations, and rabbis from the religious Zionist community (including Haim Druckman) opposed the protest. After harsh commentary by a haredi newspaper about Religious Zionist leader Haim Druckman, Yehoshua Shapira (rabbi of the Ramat Gan yeshiva) and the Association of Community Rabbis (led by Chief Rabbi of Tzfat Shmuel Eliyahu) canceled plans to attend the "million-man march".
Roads in the capital around the protest area were blocked in the early afternoon and Route 1, the main highway between the capital and the coast, was closed to private vehicles from 2:00 to 7:00 p.m.

Demonstrations 

Hundreds of thousands of protesters lined the streets surrounding the area, with Jaffa Road designated for women, despite unfavorable weather. Many leaders of the Haredi community, including the rabbis of Gur, Belz and Vizhnitz, Lithuanian rabbis Aharon Leib Shteinman, Chaim Kanievsky and Shmuel Auerbach, Sephardic rabbis Shalom Cohen and Shimon Desserts and other members of the Great Council of Torah and the Council of Torah Sages attended the rally. Members of the orthodox rabbinical community (including Yitzhak Tuvia Weiss, chief Rabbis David Lowe and Isaac Joseph, and Hasidic leaders, rabbis and public figures) were also in attendance. Small groups and religious Zionist rabbis, including Shmuel Eliyahu and Yaakov Shapira, were present.

The organizers, who called for a "million-man protest" by men and boys aged nine and older, estimated attendance at 500,000; police estimated a crowd at 300,000. Some believed that 600,000 were present, which led to a public recitation of the Chacham HaRazim blessing. All three major Jewish streams (Lithuanian, Hasidic and Sephardic) were represented. The peaceful protest was one of the largest in Israel's history, with loudspeaker noise heard across Jerusalem. It was secured by about 3,500 police and other security personnel. No speeches were made at the rally, but at its end statements received by the Council of Torah Sages were read opposing the conscription of yeshiva and kolel students. A simultaneous protest in London drew 4,000 demonstrators, and on March 9 (a week later) 50,000 Orthodox Jews demonstrated in New York City.

Protests outside of Israel 
Similar protests by Haredi Jews held around the world

America 
On June 9, 2013 a rally was held in Foley Square in Manhattan, NY to protest the conscription of Orthodox Jews into the Israeli Defense Forces. Between 20,000 and 30,000 Haredim attended. Among the speakers was Rabbi Elya Ber Wachtfogel, the rosh yeshiva of Yeshiva Gedolah Zichron Moshe in South Fallsburg, NY.

On June 11, 2017 a similar rally was held to protest plans to conscript Orthodox Jews in Israel at Barclays Center in Brooklyn, NY. Close to 20,000 Haredim attended. The speakers included Rabbi Aaron Schechter, rosh yeshiva of Yeshivas Chaim Berlin, Rabbi Leibish Leiser of Pshevorsk, known as The Pshevorsker Rebbe, one of the most prominent leaders of the Haredi community of Antwerp, Belgium, and Rabbi Yaakov Shapiro, author of The Empty Wagon: Zionism’s Journey from Identity Crisis to Identity Theft. A letter was read from Rabbi Aharon Feldman, the rosh yeshiva of Yeshivas Ner Yisroel in Baltimore, MD, who wasn’t able to attend in person. Rabbi Schechter lambasted the attempt to draft Orthodox Jews as an assault on the essential characteristics of religious Jews.

Europe 
On June 27, 2013 Haredim protested in front of the EU headquarters in Brussels, Belgium against Israel attempting to draft Orthodox yeshiva students. The protest was attended by Rabbi Ephraim Padwa, head of The Union of Orthodox Hebrew Congregations in London, Rabbi Elyakim Schlesinger, a prominent English rosh yeshiva and internationally recognized halachic authority, and Rabbi Leibish Leiser of Pshevorsk from Antwerp, Belgium.

See also
 2013 Israeli protests
 July 2019 Ethiopian Jews protest in Israel

References

2014 in Israel
2014 protests
 
Haredi anti-Zionism
Haredi Judaism in Israel
Human rights in Israel
Jewish education in Israel
Protests in Israel